Bank of Africa Kenya Limited (BOA Kenya), is a commercial bank in Kenya. It is one of the commercial banks licensed by Central Bank of Kenya, the country's central bank and the national banking regulator.

Overview 
BOA Kenya is a mid-tier bank and is ranked 15th out of the 42 commercial banks in Kenya by the CBK. The bank provides banking services to corporate, SMEs, investment groups as well as individuals. As at 31 December 2019, the bank's total assets were valued at KES:43.996 billion (US$403.27 million), with shareholders' equity valued at KSh4.28 billion (approx. USD39.2 million. The bank's customer base was in excess of 100,000, as of March 2016.

History 
The Bank traces its roots from Calyon Bank (formally Credit Agricole Indosuez) which was founded in 1981. In April 2004, Groupe Bank of Africa (BOA Group) acquired the operations of Credit Agricole Indosuez in Kenya and incorporated them into its newly formed subsidiary BOA Kenya. This transaction was completed on June 30, 2004.

BOA Kenya has invested in BOA Uganda (52.72%), making it a subsidiary and a 24.1% stake in BOA Tanzania, making it an associate.

Ownership 
BOA Kenya is a member of the Mali based Bank of Africa Group. , shareholding in the bank's stock was as depicted below:

Note: 
 Bank of Africa Group is a subsidiary of Moroccan based Banque Marocaine du Commerce Exterieur.

Governance 
BOA Kenya is governed by a ten-person board of directors with Dennis Awori as Chairman and Ronald Marambii as the Managing Director.

See also 

 List of banks in Kenya
 Bank of Africa
 Bank of Africa Ghana Limited
 Bank of Africa Rwanda Limited
 Bank of Africa Uganda Limited

References 

Banks of Kenya
Banks established in 2004
2004 establishments in Kenya